Sienna is an album by keyboardist and composer Stanley Cowell recorded in 1989 and first released on the Danish SteepleChase label.

Reception

AllMusic rated the album with 4 stars.

Track listing
All compositions by Stanley Cowell except as indicated
 "Cal Massey" – 4:08
 "I Think It's Time to Say Goodbye Again" – 9:31
 "Evidence" (Thelonious Monk) – 6:07
 "Sylvia's Place" – 5:21 
 "I Concentrate on You" (Cole Porter) – 9:48
 "Sweet Song" – 9:01 
 "Sienna" – 9:03
 "Dis Place" – 7:04
 "Celia" (Bud Powell) – 8:10

Personnel
Stanley Cowell – piano
Ron McClure – bass
Keith Copeland – drums

References

1989 albums
Stanley Cowell albums
SteepleChase Records albums